Michael Shanks (born 1970) is a Canadian actor best known for his role as Daniel Jackson on Stargate SG-1.

Michael Shanks may also refer to:
 Michael Shanks (archaeologist) (born 1959), British archaeologist
 Michael Shanks (journalist) (1927–1984), British journalist
 Uncle Mover (born 1953), American perennial candidate

See also
 Michael Shank (born 1966), American race car team owner and former race car driver